With George Bush on My Mind is a 2003 Spanish comedy-drama film directed by Joaquín Oristrell, which stars Javier Cámara, Juan Diego Botto, Elvira Mínguez and María Botto.

Plot 
The plot follows a troupe of thespians preparing a stage play (García Lorca's Play Without a Title). The replacement lead actor is also set to read an anti war manifesto at the end of the show.

Cast

Production 
The screenplay was penned by the four leads alongside Oristrell. A Centro de Nuevos Creadores and Garbo Producciones production, the film featured a "very small" budget, and it was shot in 3 weeks and a half.

Release 
The film premiered at the 51st San Sebastián International Film Festival in September 2003. It was theatrically released in Spain on 17 October 2003.

Reception 
Esteve Riambau of Fotogramas rated the film 5 out of 5 stars, writing that the film came "from the guts" to show the actors' commitment to the campaign against the Iraq War, and that it also "becomes an excellent portrait of the world of comedians", praising its boldness as the best thing about it.

Casimiro Torreiro of El País considered, that rather than an erudite dissection of a stage play, the film tries to "reproduce the emotional pulse of a few days, those of the first months of 2003, lived frantically"; the chronicle about the commitment to protest against the war in Iraq, also praising the performances of the two Bottos, Mínguez and Cámara.

See also 
 List of Spanish films of 2003

References 

2003 comedy-drama films
Spanish comedy-drama films
2000s Spanish-language films
Anti-war films about the Iraq War
Films about actors
2000s Spanish films